Dalibor Teinović (Serbian Cyrillic: Дaлибop Teинoвић; born 22 March 1977) is a retired Bosnian professional footballer.

Honours
Maribor
Slovenian PrvaLiga: 2002–03
Slovenian Cup: 2003–04
Domžale
Slovenian Cup: 2010–11
Slovenian Supercup: 2011

External links
Stats from Slovenia at PrvaLiga 

1977 births
Living people
People from Kotor Varoš
Serbs of Bosnia and Herzegovina
Association football midfielders
Bosnia and Herzegovina footballers
FK Borac Banja Luka players
NK Šmartno ob Paki players
NK Maribor players
Hapoel Petah Tikva F.C. players
NK Primorje players
NK Domžale players
NK Radomlje players
Slovenian PrvaLiga players
Israeli Premier League players
Bosnia and Herzegovina expatriate footballers
Expatriate footballers in Slovenia
Bosnia and Herzegovina expatriate sportspeople in Slovenia
Expatriate footballers in Israel
Bosnia and Herzegovina expatriate sportspeople in Israel
Bosnia and Herzegovina football managers
Bosnia and Herzegovina expatriate football managers
Expatriate football managers in Slovenia